Akbar Ali (born 8 October 2001) is a Bangladeshi cricketer. He was referred as "Akbar the Great" after Bangladesh's victory in 2020 Under-19 Cricket World Cup under his captaincy and for his unbeaten knock in the final.

Career
Akbar made his Twenty20 debut for Bangladesh Krira Shikkha Protishtan in the 2018–19 Dhaka Premier Division Twenty20 Cricket League on 25 February 2019. He made his List A debut for Bangladesh Krira Shikkha Protishtan in the 2018–19 Dhaka Premier Division Cricket League on 8 March 2019.

In December 2019, Akbar was named as the captain of Bangladesh's squad for the 2020 Under-19 Cricket World Cup. Under his captaincy, Bangladesh won the Under-19 Cricket World Cup, the first ever major ICC event title for Bangladesh. In the final, they defeated India by three wickets, via the DLS method, to win their first ever ICC title.

In February 2021, Akbar was selected in the Bangladesh Emerging squad for their home series against the Ireland Wolves. Akbar made his first-class debut on 26 February 2021, for the Bangladesh Emerging team against Ireland Wolves.

In November 2021, he was named in Bangladesh's Twenty20 International (T20I) squad for their series against Pakistan.

References

External links
 

2001 births
Living people
Bangladeshi cricketers
Bangladesh Krira Shikkha Protishtan cricketers
People from Rangpur District